Among Those Present is a 1921 American "three-reeler" silent comedy film directed by Fred C. Newmeyer and starring Harold Lloyd, Mildred Davis and Mary Pickford .

Plot
Mrs. O'Brien (Herring) is eager to be accepted as part of high society, and she is hosting a fox hunt as part of her plans. Her husband and daughter, though, have no interest in society affairs.

Mrs. O'Brien wants to invite Lord Abernathy to the hunt, and she mentions this to the "society pilot" who is advising her. But this woman and a confederate are merely using Mrs. O'Brien and the hunt for their own purposes. When Lord Abernathy is unavailable, they convince an ambitious young man (Lloyd) to impersonate him, so that they can proceed with their scheme.

Cast
 Harold Lloyd as The Boy
 Mildred Davis as The Girl
 James T. Kelley as Mr. O'Brien, the Father
 Aggie Herring as Mrs. O'Brien, the Mother
 Vera White as Society Pilot
 William Gillespie as Hard Boiled Party
 Mary Pickford as Girl of his Dreams

Production
The film used several uncredited actors including:

Rollin Aremz
Olive Barker
Hal Berg
K. Bleus
Roy Brooks
Sammy Brooks as Guest
Bobby Brydon
Evelyn Burns
Jack Byron
Joe Campbell
Al Caukins
Margaret Cleveland
Barney Crozier
Mary Culver
Frank Daniels
Grace Darnell
Harry Davenport
Olive Ellingwood
W.H. Ely
Lillian Farrell
Nell Folt
Carla Freege
Jim Gether
Louis Goldstone
Minette Grosse
Dorothy Hagan
Adelaide Hallock
Jules Hanft
Jessie Heathman
Jay Higgins
Ray L. Holmes
Slim Holmes
Harry Howard
Wallace Howe as Butler
Mark Jones as Horse Handler
Clo King
Nellie Kushell
M.S. Lacey
Gaylord Lloyd
Chris Lynton
Bert Maddox
William McCormack
Jack McGinnis
E.G. Miller
Harold Miller
Marie Mills
Dorothy Morgan
Jack Morgan
Dolly Mullen
George Murphy
Louis Natheaux
Alice Nichols
William H. O'Brien
Richard Pannell
Tex Parker, Hazel Powell
Gus Priddy
Joe Ray
James Richardson
Bertha Roberts
Betty Roddy
Laura Roessing
Constantine Romanoff
Jack Russell
Lou Salter
Alma Saunders
Don Saunders
Alma Schram
Olaf Schuler
Louis Shank
Jerry Shelton
Ida Shoemaker
William Sidmore
H.C. Simmons
Jack Singleton
Crete Sipple
Lyle Tayo
Jessalyn Van Trump
Anna Wilson
Noah Young as Horse Handler

See also
 Harold Lloyd filmography

External links
 

Progressive Silent Film List: Among Those Present at silentera.com

1921 films
1920s English-language films
1921 comedy films
American black-and-white films
American silent short films
Films directed by Fred C. Newmeyer
Silent American comedy films
Films with screenplays by H. M. Walker
Films with screenplays by Sam Taylor (director)
1921 short films
American comedy short films
1920s American films